Scanno is a town and district in the province of L'Aquila, in the Abruzzo region of central Italy.
 
The town is bordered by Anversa degli Abruzzi, Barrea, Bisegna, Bugnara, Civitella Alfedena, Introdacqua, Opi, Pescasseroli, Pettorano sul Gizio, Rivisondoli, Rocca Pia, Villalago and Villetta Barrea.

History
Situated in the Sagittario Valley and encircled by the Majella mountains, Scanno has been immortalised by photographers Henri Cartier-Bresson (1951) and Mario Giacomelli (1957–59) and, according to Edward Lear, was host to Italy's most beautiful women.

Local legend has it that Scanno's natural lake (Lago di Scanno - stocked with pike and perch and Abruzzo’s largest natural basin) was created by a feud between a white witch and a sorcerer; the lake marking the spot where the witch finally fell.

People
For a brief period during World War II, future Italian president Carlo Azeglio Ciampi was a refugee in the town.

Quinto Mancini (1893–1963), the father of American composer Henry Mancini, was born in Scanno on 13 March 1893 and later emigrated to America.

Main sites
Hermitage of Sant'Egidio
Sant'Antonio da Padova
Santa Maria della Valle or Chiesa Matrice
Madonna di Constatinopoli

References

 
Hilltowns in Abruzzo
Ski areas and resorts in Italy